Fuel Cells—From Fundamentals to Systems is a bimonthly peer-reviewed scientific journal covering fundamental and applied research on fuel cell technology. Disciplines of interest are chemistry, materials science, physics, chemical engineering, electrical engineering, and mechanical engineering. Publishing formats include original research papers and reviews. It is published by Wiley-VCH and the editor-in-chief is Ulrich Stimming (TUM CREATE Center for Electromobility).

Abstracting and indexing 
The journal is abstracted and indexed by:

According to the Journal Citation Reports, the journal has a 2020 impact factor of 2.250.

References

External links 
 

Energy and fuel journals
Bimonthly journals
Wiley-VCH academic journals
English-language journals
Publications established in 2001